Thysanoplusia exquisita  is a moth of the family Noctuidae. it is found in southern Africa, from Angola to Madagascar and South Africa, as well as in Oman, Afghanistan, Iran and Pakistan.

Biology
Known hostplants of the larvae of this species are Asteraceae (Senecio bupleuroides and Euryops spathaceus)

References

External links
Africanmoths: images & distribution map

Trichoplusia
Moths of Madagascar
Fauna of Lesotho
Insects of the Arabian Peninsula
Moths of Africa